Claire Bernice Davenport (24 April 1933 – 25 February 2002) was an English character actress well known for her large physique.

Life and career
Davenport was born on 24 April 1933 in Sale, Cheshire, and began acting in 1961 with a theatre role in Caesar and Cleopatra at the Playhouse in Oxford.

Her film work includes roles in Return of the Jedi (as Yarna d'al' Gargan, originally billed as "Fat Dancer"), The Return of the Pink Panther, Adventures of a Plumber's Mate, Carry On Emmannuelle, The Tempest and The Elephant Man. On television, she appeared on Remington Steele, Doctor Who, Minder, George and Mildred, Robin's Nest, Fawlty Towers and at least three episodes of On the Buses, among others. She also made a cameo appearance in an episode of Mind Your Language. Among the last of her television appearances was a 1993 episode of The Smell of Reeves and Mortimer.

Death
Davenport stopped working after suffering a series of strokes in the 1990s. She died at the age of 68 in London on 25 February 2002 (not 4 March, as often stated) from kidney failure.

Filmography

Film

Partial television roles

Notes

Bibliography

External links 
 
 
 Davenport Profile on Avelyman.com
 https://web.archive.org/web/20130823072539/http://starwarsblog.starwars.com/index.php/2013/08/19/star-wars-mysteries-who-is-wiebba-wiebba/

1933 births
2002 deaths
Actresses from Greater Manchester
Deaths from kidney failure
English film actresses
English television actresses
People from Sale, Greater Manchester
Actresses from London
20th-century British businesspeople